South Hunsley School & Sixth Form College is a large secondary school and sixth form, situated in Melton in the East Riding of Yorkshire, England, near the A63. In April 2010, the school became an Academy.

Overview
The school was founded as South Hunsley County Secondary School in 1956. It occupies , and has been expanded since opening.

As of 2012 South Hunsley is a specialist Technology college. The school has public sporting facilities including a gymnasium and a 3G football pitch. In 2007, 69% of pupils gained 5 grade A-C GCSEs, including English and Maths, the best for state schools in the East Riding of Yorkshire, with almost 2000 students.

As of 2013, the grouping systems were:
Years (7, 8, 9, 10, 11, 12, 13)
Houses (Indus, Draco, Pegasus, Orion, Hercules, Vela) 
Form (1-12 Formatted Year-Form (e.g. Year 7 form 3 is written as 7–3))

In 2014, the South Hunsley Primary was set to open in September 2015.

Alumni 

 Harry Cardwell, footballer.
 Sarah Cruddas, science broadcaster.
 Alex Deakin, Met Office weather presenter.
 Loz Hardy and Myles Howell of Kingmaker.
 Daniel James, footballer.
 Marc Pickering, actor.
 Debra Stephenson, actress.
 Jess Park, footballer.

References

External links 
South Hunsley school web site

Academies in the East Riding of Yorkshire
Secondary schools in the East Riding of Yorkshire
Specialist technology colleges in England